Dhirendra Debbarma  is an Tripuri Indian politician and member of Indigenous People's Front of Tripura. He won 2018 Tripura Legislative Assembly election from Mandaibazar of West Tripura district. Dhirendra Debbrma is a member of the Tripura Legislative Assembly from 2018 to present.

References

Year of birth missing (living people)
Living people
Indigenous People's Front of Tripura
Tripura MLAs 2018–2023